Chaldybar (formerly also Chaldovar) is a village in the Panfilov District of Chüy Region of Kyrgyzstan. Its population was 8,465 in 2021.

Population

References

Populated places in Chüy Region